La Rioja is the capital and largest city of La Rioja Province, Argentina, located in the east of the province.

History 

It was founded in 1591 by the governor of Tucumán Province.

Geography

Climate 

Sights
The Museo Folklórico is set in a 17th-century building, and its displays include local chaya music and the Tinkunaco festival. The 35,000-capacity Estadio Carlos Augusto Mercado Luna is located in La Rioja.

Transportation
The city is served by Capitán Vicente Almandos Almonacid Airport, with flights on Aerolíneas Argentinas.

References

External links 

 Official page (Spanish)
 
 City Information (English)
 Universidad Nacional de La Rioja (Spanish)

Populated places established in 1591
Populated places in La Rioja Province, Argentina
Capitals of Argentine provinces
Cities in Argentina
Argentina
La Rioja Province, Argentina